Kaplan Law School was a for-profit educational institution offering post-graduate legal training in London for those wishing to become a solicitor in England and Wales. In April 2016, it announced the closure of all programmes to new applicants, effectively ending the schools activities.

History
Kaplan Law School was opened by the British arm of Kaplan Inc. in September 2007. It operates in partnership with Nottingham Law School by providing Nottingham's professional legal courses in Central London.

In 2014 Kaplan announced its Legal Practice Course offering would include an LLM in Legal Practice awarded by Nottingham Trent University.

82% of Kaplan's 2014 Graduate Diploma in Law graduates were awarded either a Distinction or Commendation.

86% of Kaplan's 2014 Legal Practice Course graduates were awarded either a Distinction or Commendation.

Kaplan Law School offered students one to one bespoke careers advice from the moment they accept an offer until a year after completing the course. Based on those students who consulted the Careers Service on a regular basis, 84% of their 2013 LPC graduates obtained a Training Contract.

All programmes ceased by 2018, as the school announced its closure. No new applicants were permitted to enroll on any courses.

Courses offered
Kaplan Law School offered the LLM Legal Practice Course and the Graduate Diploma in Law.  In addition, Kaplan allowed students from a conversion course background to obtain graduate-LL.B. degrees awarded by Nottingham Trent University (of which Nottingham Law School is a constituent part).

Location
Kaplan Law School was situated on Borough High Street by the South Bank of the River Thames, close to Southwark Cathedral, Borough Market and the Tate Modern.

References

External links
 Kaplan Law School official website
 Kaplan, Inc. official website

Law schools in England